FSG can refer to:

 Finite state grammar
 Falling sand game
 Fishersgate railway station, a railway station in Sussex, England
 Fluorosilicate glass
 Focal segmental glomerulosclerosis
 Free Spirit Gathering, an American Pagan and Pantheist event
 United States Federal Sentencing Guidelines

Organizations 
 Fellow of the Society of Genealogists
 Florida State Guard, active during World War II
 Folkestone School for Girls, in England
 Fortress Study Group, a British historical charity
 Free Standards Group, a defunct open-source standards organization

Businesses 
 Facility Solutions Group, an American electrical engineering company
 Farrar, Straus and Giroux, an American book publisher
 Fenway Sports Group, an American sports investment company
 Flensburger Schiffbau-Gesellschaft, a German shipbuilder
 Frontier Services Group, a Hong Kong-based, Africa-focused security, aviation, and logistics company